Walter Brun (born 20 October 1942) is a Swiss former racing driver and founder of Brun Motorsport. He also co-founded the Formula One team EuroBrun with Giampaolo Pavanello.

Racing record

24 Hours of Le Mans results

Complete British Saloon Car Championship results
(key) (Races in bold indicate pole position; races in italics indicate fastest lap.)

References

1942 births
Living people
Swiss racing drivers
Swiss motorsport people
24 Hours of Le Mans drivers
World Sportscar Championship drivers
Deutsche Tourenwagen Masters drivers
Formula One team owners
Formula One team principals

Schnitzer Motorsport drivers